Snap Fitness is a privately owned and operated health and fitness club founded in 2003 by Peter Taunton. Its headquarters is in Chanhassen, Minnesota, United States.

Snap Fitness is associated by ownership and otherwise with other fitness and franchise businesses through its parent Lift Brands and various affiliate companies.  Those brands include 9Round, YogaFit Studios, Insurgence, Steele Fitness, Kosama and TRUMAV.

Snap Fitness operates in 48 states in the United States, plus Australia, Belgium, Canada, Egypt, Georgia, Hong Kong, India, Indonesia, Ireland, Mexico, The Netherlands, New Zealand, Philippines, Spain, Taiwan, Turkey, United Arab Emirates, United Kingdom.

History
Snap Fitness was founded in 2003 by Peter Taunton. In 2004, Snap Fitness started franchising around the US. Locations were added in Australia and New Zealand in 2009.

As of 2008, Snap Fitness has 910 clubs with 400,000 members in 46 states in the US.

Shortly following, India, Egypt, and Mexico signed Master Franchise Agreements in 2012.

By October 2014, Snap Fitness had expanded into the UK by signing an Area Developer Agreement with TwentyTwo Yards Ltd. Snap Fitness entered Spain, The Netherlands, Belgium, Luxembourg, Georgia, and the Philippines in 2015 by way of separate Master Franchise Agreements for each country. That same year, Snap Fitness signed a Master Franchise Agreement with Saudi Arabia. In late April 2016, Snap Fitness announced that the company had secured a major development deal for the United Kingdom with MSG Life Limited. MSG's original goal was to open 30 Snap Fitness locations across the UK but its target expansion goal is currently 100+.

An Area Developer Agreement was signed for Ireland in August 2016. Praveen Bhatnagar signed on as the master franchisee for the UAE in October 2016. In 2017 Snap Fitness signed agreements with Hong Kong, Taiwan, Indonesia, and Singapore.

Tim McGraw's Signature Snap Fitness club, TRUMAV, opened in January 2019 in Nashville, TN.

References

External links

Health clubs in the United States
Companies based in Minnesota
Chanhassen, Minnesota
Health care companies established in 2003
2003 establishments in Minnesota
Medical and health organizations based in Minnesota